The Apocalypse of John is commonly referred to as the Book of Revelation.

Apocalypse of John may also refer to:
 The Second Apocalypse of John, also called the First Apocryphal Apocalypse of John, Greek apocalypse
 The Apocalypse of John Chrysostom, also called the Second Apocryphal Apocalypse of John, Greek
 The Apocalypse of John the Little, Syriac apocalypse

See also 
 Apocalypse (disambiguation)
 Book of Revelation (disambiguation)